Ngāruawāhia is a town in the Waikato region of the North Island of New Zealand. Ngāruawāhia is in the Hamilton Urban Area, the fourth largest urban area in New Zealand. The location was once considered as a potential capital of New Zealand.

Demographics

Ngāruawāhia had slightly smaller boundaries in the 2018 Census, covering . It had a population of 6,621, an increase of 1,257 people (23.4%) since the 2013 census, and an increase of 1,287 people (24.1%) since the 2006 census. There were 1,962 households, comprising 3,234 males and 3,384 females, giving a sex ratio of 0.96 males per female, with 1,914 people (28.9%) aged under 15 years, 1,434 (21.7%) aged 15 to 29, 2,661 (40.2%) aged 30 to 64, and 606 (9.2%) aged 65 or older.

Ethnicities were 54.2% European/Pākehā, 58.7% Māori, 5.9% Pacific peoples, 3.1% Asian, and 1.4% other ethnicities. People may identify with more than one ethnicity.

The percentage of people born overseas was 8.6, compared with 27.1% nationally.

Although some people chose not to answer the census's question about religious affiliation, 53.5% had no religion, 30.4% were Christian, 6.1% had Māori religious beliefs, 0.6% were Hindu, 0.2% were Buddhist and 1.4% had other religions.

Of those at least 15 years old, 579 (12.3%) people had a bachelor's or higher degree, and 1,155 (24.5%) people had no formal qualifications. 468 people (9.9%) earned over $70,000 compared to 17.2% nationally. The employment status of those at least 15 was that 2,391 (50.8%) people were employed full-time, 558 (11.9%) were part-time, and 348 (7.4%) were unemployed.

History

Early history

The name Ngāruawāhia means "the opened food pits", which derives from a great feast in the 17th century. Te Ngaere, a Ngāti Tamainupō chief, and Heke-i-te-rangi, a Ngāti Maniapoto woman, had eloped and settled at Ngāruawāhia, causing a rift between their tribes. When their first child was born, Ngāti Maniapoto were invited to the celebration in an attempt to reconcile the tribes. Te Ngaere's father named the boy Te Mana-o-te-rangi in honour of Ngāti Maniapoto. Peace was established between the tribes, and Te Ngaere shouted "Wāhia ngā rua" (break open the food pits).

Invasion 

When Rangiriri pā was taken by General Cameron after a white flag of truce was flown, Cameron informed Māori that Governor Grey would only come to talk peace if his forces were allowed to enter Ngāruawāhia unopposed. Cameron entered a deserted Ngāruawāhia on 8 December 1863, but Grey never came to talk peace. Despite Māori protest, sales of confiscated land went ahead in 1864, shortly after the invasion. During the 19th century, Ngāruawāhia was named Queenstown and then Newcastle. However, the town returned to the original name in 1878.

20th century
A  gas power station was built in Herschell St in 1913 by the Town Board for lighting. It used Glen Massey coal, which was converted to gas in a Cambridge Patent Gas Producer (many were used about this time in Australasia) and used to drive a 2-cylinder gas engine. It closed in 1924. Much of the machinery was removed in 1950 and from 1954 the building was used as a scout hall.

Officers from the United States visited Ngāruawāhia during World War II and would share food at hāngi. Queen Elizabeth II has visited Ngāruawāhia on two occasions (1953 & 1974). On the latter occasion, then Māori Queen Dame Te Ātairangikaahu and her husband Whatumoana Paki welcomed Queen Elizabeth II to the local marae. The Great Ngaruawahia Music Festival was held in 1973, and featured many music acts, including some that went on to become internationally famous such as Black Sabbath and Split Enz. It was the first large outdoor music festival in New Zealand.

In 1980, Mayor Latta released a book about the history of the town titled 'Meeting of the Waters'.

In March 1998, a freight train derailed on the local North Island Main Trunk line's rail bridge across the Waikato River. The incident caused structural damage to the bridge.

Water supply 
Until 1923 springs in Waipa Esplanade and Market Street were used. The population was then 1100 in 240 houses. By 1965 the population was 3,630, so water was instead pumped from the Waikato and from a deep bore, with a new reservoir and water treatment plant opened in 1965.

21st century 
By April 2001, the damaged rail bridge was mended.

In 2008, Ngāruawāhia set a world record for the largest haka and by 2010 the town had its own community news.

In 2011, murals were installed for Ngāruawāhia's 150th anniversary in 2013  Ngaruawahia High School (which opened in 1963) celebrated its 50th anniversary in 2013.

In May 2016, Heather du Plessis-Allan (an NZME broadcaster) claimed that the "town is rotting". The broadcaster later accepted a challenge to visit the town and an article relating to the incident appeared on a Waikato Times front page. According to Waikato District Mayor Allan Sanson, du Plessis-Allan "really upset locals". In June 2016, local mayor Allan Sanson said du Plessis-Allan spent around three hours in the town, apologizing to residents.

In 2019, the name of the town was officially gazetted as Ngāruawāhia.

Infrastructure

Waikato River crossings 

Until the Waikato invasion the rivers were the main transport routes, but, after the Great South Road and main trunk line were built, the rivers became barriers, which needed crossings.

As early as 1870 a public meeting called for a bridge, but a punt continued to be the main means of crossing the river until the road-rail bridge opened for traffic in 1876. So long as there were few trains, there was little complaint that gates closed 10 minutes before a train was due. However, by the 1900s road and rail traffic was increasing, averaging 20 trains, 275 pedestrians, 43 equestrians, 29 light vehicles, 18 milk carts, 6 wagons, and 55 stock a day in 1910.

1921 single-lane road bridge 
A survey for a road bridge was done in 1911. Test borings for piles were done in 1912. The Ngāruawāhia Town Board and Waikato, Waipa, and Raglan County Councils agreed to share the cost in 1914. The State Advances office lent £2,500 for the bridge in 1915. Wartime shortages caused further delays, but by 1917 the new bridge was taking shape. Further delay occurred when additional piles had to be driven. The Minister reported the work well in hand in 1919, but then a temporary bridge, used in construction, was hit by a steamer. Work got under way again, £3,000 was in the Public Works Estimates and the bridge was reported complete in 1920, except for its approaches. The bridge opened in 1921 and, on 28 July 1921, was officially opened by the Minister of Public Works, J. G. Coates. The others were reinforced concrete on concrete piling and the deck and trusses of Australian hardwood.

Complaints had been made about a single-lane bridge since before it was built, so, when the new NIMT bridge was built, the Main Highways Board leased the old one and added decking. The conversion was completed in early November 1931, allowing 2-way traffic. Single lane traffic was reinstated for a few months in 1936 to allow a  truss on the 1921 bridge to be replaced. Traffic was still increasing. In 1935 traffic between Ohinewai and Ngāruawāhia averaged 660 vehicles a day. By 1938 it had risen to 1,329.

1956 bridge 
On 13 March 1953 a contract was let for a new steel truss bridge. An April 1955 photo shows two piers in the river. On 20 August 1955 the centre span was placed and a 1955 photo shows the bridge almost finished. The first car drove over the bridge on 19 October 1956. By 2008 17,392 vehicles a day were crossing the bridge. No more recent counts have been published, but, after the opening of the Taupiri link in 2013, traffic on the Great South Rd in Ngāruawāhia, was 12,467 in 2015, suggesting that traffic on the bridge has been reduced by about 5,000 vehicles a day.

Listed buildings 
Ngāruawāhia's history is reflected in the number of its Listed Buildings –

Category 1 Turangawaewae House built in 1912–1919 as Te Kauhanganui building in a fusion of Arts and Crafts and traditional Māori styles;

Category 2 – Band Rotunda, Delta Tavern, Doctor's House, former bakery, former Flourmill Store, former Māori pā – Puke i Ahua, Grant's Chambers, 13 Lower Waikato Esplanade, 2 Old Taupiri Rd, Pioneer Gun Turret, Riverdale, St Paul's Church, War Memorial.

Community

Māori King Movement

Ngāruawāhia is home to the Kīngitanga. The first Māori King, Pōtatau Te Wherowhero, was crowned at Ngāruawāhia in 1858 and was living there when he died two years later. The current Māori King is Tūheitia Paki; he obtained the throne at Tūrangawaewae Marae immediately following his mother's passing in 2006.

Marae

Ngāruawāhia has two marae affiliated with the Waikato Tainui hapū of Ngāti Mahuta and Ngāti Te Weehi: Tūrangawaewae and its Mahinaarangi or Turongo meeting house, and Waikeri-Tangirau Marae.

Tribal Huk
A local gang is Tribal Huk, who have been seen as heroes by the community for providing lunches to schoolchildren in Ngāruawāhia, Hamilton and Huntly. In particular, they have been known for making sandwiches, which earned them the nickname "Sandwich Gang".

In October 2016, Tribal Huk president Jamie Pink started a movement against methamphetamine, known in New Zealand as "P". Waikato District Mayor Allan Sanson supported Pink's message to Ngāruawāhia methamphetamine dealers to either leave the town within 24 hours or "visits" would begin.
The demand was also supported by members of the community who had gathered at a local meeting. According to a gang source, Ngāruawāhia became P free, but the Police Association stated that there was no evidence that P dealers had left Ngāruawāhia. There is additionally concern Pink has damaged the work that Tribal Huk did feeding a thousand Waikato schoolchildren.

In November 2016, another community meeting was held. Pink was not present.

Christianity 
In the 1996 census, the majority of residents identified as Christian. A Bible is traditionally used during the crowning of a Māori monarch. In 1995, the Holy Trinity Anglican Church burned down, and a new church had been built in its place by 1998.

On the northern side of the Waipā River is the Christian Youth Camps (CYC), the largest youth camp site in New Zealand.  CYC started in the early 1960s with large Easter conventions.  Today there are two separate camp sites on 38 hectares of land. The camp offers school holiday camps throughout the year.  During the terms, the camps are used by various groups, including schools, churches and sporting organisations.

Sport and recreation

Football (soccer)
Ngaruawahia United, known as "The Green Machine", is the local football (soccer) club, founded in 1968. Centennial Park serves as the home ground for the club, and has been the home venue for ASB Premiership side Waikato FC in past seasons.

Rugby league
The town's rugby league teams are Ngaruawahia Panthers and Tūrangawaewae.
The 'Ngaruawahia Rugby League Club' is the oldest such club in the Waikato. Early games were played on varying venues, for instance Taupiri paddock and Paterson Park. The first major match for the town was held in August 1911 when they lost to Auckland 22 – 36 at the Caledonian Ground in Frankton. Ngaruawahia did however beat Hamilton United 27 – 4 in the first ever Northern Union game to be played at Hamilton's Steele Park in 1912. The senior team were Champion of Champions in 1956 and 1957.

Ngāruawāhia is the home of the rugby league team Turangawaewae RLC, which is named after the marae opposite the clubrooms. The club currently holds the record for the first team to win consecutive titles in the annual Waicoa Bay Premiers Competition, consisting of all teams in the Waikato, Coast and Bay Of Plenty regions.
'Ngaruawahia Rugby League Club' (Panthers) are 2011 champions, Premiers, U17, U14, U13 are all champions.

River activities 
The local regatta has been a fundamental event for the region for well over a century. An event is held every year in March on the Waikato River. The first regatta was an unofficial event in 1892, involving both Māori and Pākehā festivities. The regatta provided a means of association between two ethnic groups, socially and culturally. The first official regatta took place in 1896 and since then has grown to become one of New Zealand's largest aquatic festivals. During the centennial regatta in March 1996, over 48,000 people visited the town to see thousands of performers from a number of countries.

For many years, jumping off the rail bridge has been a tradition. However, organisations such as KiwiRail want the practice to end.

Hopuhopu 

From 1853 Hopuhopu had a boys' mission school, which lost most of its pupils in 1862 and, by 1863, was reported as in disrepair. The mission house burnt down in 1886. An army camp was  built on the mission site in the 1920s, including its own water supply, ammunition dumps and a railway siding. A 1925 photograph showed only one building and many tents, but a 1955 aerial photo showed the extent of building, which was largely complete by 1927. In 1993 the camp was returned to Waikato-Tainui, who converted it to their headquarters and Waikato-Tainui College for Research and Development.

Education

Former residents
 Kelvin Cruickshank, television personality
 Martin Donnelly, cricketer
 Shaun Kenny-Dowall, rugby league player
 Inia Te Wiata, operatic singer and traditional carver
 Richard Tomlinson, MI6 officer
 Dallin Watene-Zelezniak, rugby league player
 Allan Wilson, biochemist

See also
 Ngaruawahia Railway Station
 Glen Massey Line

Notes

References

External links 

 1861 drawing
 Auckland Weekly News photo – road and rail bridges in 1922
 1926 photos of Hophopu
 Photo of 1936 tar sealing of Great South Rd
 Whites Aviation Collection, Alexander Turnbull Library photos of Waikato river bridges 1946 and 1947

Waikato District
Populated places in Waikato
1863 establishments in New Zealand
 
Māori culture
Populated places on the Waikato River